Nasser Givehchi (12 November 1932 – 15 May 2017) was an Iranian featherweight freestyle wrestler. He competed at the 1952 and 1956 Olympics and won a silver medal in 1952. He ranked fifth at the 1954 World Wrestling Championships and won a bronze medal at the 1958 Asian Games. After retiring from competitions he had a long career as a national wrestling coach and international referee.

References

External links
 

1932 births
2017 deaths
Asian Games bronze medalists for Iran
Asian Games medalists in wrestling
Iranian male sport wrestlers
Olympic medalists in wrestling
Olympic silver medalists for Iran
Olympic wrestlers of Iran
Medalists at the 1952 Summer Olympics
Medalists at the 1958 Asian Games
Wrestlers at the 1952 Summer Olympics
Wrestlers at the 1956 Summer Olympics
Wrestlers at the 1958 Asian Games
20th-century Iranian people
21st-century Iranian people